Cynthia-Ann Thomas (born 1950s) is an American former professional tennis player.

Tennis career
As a junior competing in the under-12s, Thomas was ranked amongst the top-10 players in the U.S.

Thomas played collegiate tennis for the UCLA Bruins and earned All-American honors in 1976 before joining the tour, where she featured in the doubles main draw of grand slam tournaments, including Wimbledon.

Personal life
Thomas is a third-generation Californian, with her great-grandfather the founder of Cawston Ostrich Farm in South Pasadena, which was the country's first ostrich farm.

In 1981 she married James Pardee Jr at a church in Beverly Hills.

References

External links
 

1950s births
Living people
American female tennis players
UCLA Bruins women's tennis players
Sportspeople from Los Angeles County, California
Tennis people from California